Julio César Suazo Bernárdez (born 5 October 1978) is a retired Honduran football defender.

Club career
Nicknamed Pungui, Suazo came through the youth ranks at Victoria and moved to Europe in 2000 to play for SV Wüstenrot Salzburg alongside compatriots Maynor Suazo and Juan Manuel Cárcamo. He also had spells at Real España, whom he left for Hispano before the 2007 Clausura, as well as at Turkish third division side Eğirdir Belediye Spor where he played alongside compatriot Francisco Antonio Pavón. Also, he played a few games for Chilean side Huachipato.

He finally returned to Honduras and joined Savio during the 2009 Apertura after a delay in the release by the Turkish federation, but was the third player to leave the club in September 2009 for not paying his wages. He played the 2011 Clausura for Heredia in Guatemala.

In December 2012, he announced he would retire after the 2013 Clausura but after scoring an own goal against Vida in March 2013, he quit immediately and declared to pursue a coaching career.

International career
He was part of the Honduras U-17 squad at the 1994 CONCACAF U-17 Tournament. In 1996, Suazo was part of the Honduras U-20 squad at the CONCACAF U20 championship in Mexico.

Suazo made his senior debut for Honduras in a May 1999 friendly match against Haiti and has earned a total of 4 caps, scoring no goals. He has represented his country at the 2000 Summer Olympics.

His final international was a June 2003 friendly match against Venezuela.

References

External links

1978 births
Living people
People from La Ceiba
Association football defenders
Honduran footballers
Honduran expatriate footballers
Honduras international footballers
Footballers at the 2000 Summer Olympics
Olympic footballers of Honduras
C.D. Victoria players
Real C.D. España players
Hispano players
C.D. Huachipato footballers
Deportes Savio players
Expatriate footballers in Austria
Expatriate footballers in Turkey
Expatriate footballers in Chile
Expatriate footballers in Guatemala
Honduran expatriate sportspeople in Chile
Honduran expatriate sportspeople in Guatemala
Liga Nacional de Fútbol Profesional de Honduras players
Chilean Primera División players
Austrian Football Bundesliga players
Pan American Games silver medalists for Honduras
Footballers at the 1999 Pan American Games
Medalists at the 1999 Pan American Games
Pan American Games medalists in football